Eric R. Gilbertson was the third and longest-serving President of Saginaw Valley State University, in the U.S. state of Michigan. He succeeded Dr. Jack McBride Ryder as President of SVSU in August 1989, serving until his retirement in February 2014.  Since his arrival, approximately $196 million in construction has been completed on the SVSU campus, with enrollments increasing from 5,915 in fall semester 1989 to over 10,000 when he left office.

President Gilbertson earned a Juris Doctor degree (with honors) from Cleveland State University. He holds a masters of arts in economics from Ohio University and a bachelor of science degree from Bluffton College (Ohio). Prior to his arrival at SVSU, Dr. Gilbertson served as president of Johnson State College (Vermont), was legal counsel to the Ohio Board of Regents, and was executive assistant to the president of Ohio State University.

Dr. Gilbertson has traveled and lectured extensively in Asia. In 1993 he received an Honorary Doctor of Literature Degree from the University of Mysore, Karnataka, India. He is also involved in many professional and civic organizations.

While at SVSU, he was instrumental in the creation of the Donna J. Roberts Fellowship, the premier fellowship at the university.  The Donna J. Roberts fellowship is awarded to students who exhibit leadership qualities and who have shown a past and future commitment to public service.

On August 18, 2014, the SVSU Board of Control voted to rename the Regional Education Center on campus after Gilbertson.

References

Saginaw Valley State University people
Johnson State College
Living people
Bluffton University alumni
Cleveland–Marshall College of Law alumni
Ohio University alumni
Ohio State University staff
Heads of universities and colleges in the United States
Year of birth missing (living people)